Edlington is a village in the East Lindsey district of Lincolnshire, England. In the 2001 census, the parish population was recorded as 147, reducing to 134 at the 2011 census.

Edlington Grade II listed Anglican parish church is dedicated to St Helen. Originating in the 12th century, it was rebuilt in 1859 by James Fowler, but retained its Norman tower arch and Early English font.

A further listed building is the late 16th-century Hall Farm House.

References

External links

"Edlington", Genuki.org.uk. Retrieved 26 July 2011

Villages in Lincolnshire
East Lindsey District